Manjunath Kunnur (born 2 December 1954) was a member of the 14th Lok Sabha of India. He represented the Dharwad South constituency of Karnataka and was a member of the Bharatiya Janata Party (BJP) political party. He joined Indian National Congress and unsuccessfully contested 2009 Indian general election from Dharwad against Pralhad Joshi.

Education
Manjunath Kunnur completed his B.Sc.,LL.B. (Spl.) from University Law College, Dharwad.

References

External links
 Members of Fourteenth Lok Sabha - Parliament of India website
 2009 Candidate Affidavit

Living people
1954 births
India MPs 2004–2009
People from Dharwad
Lok Sabha members from Karnataka
Bharatiya Janata Party politicians from Karnataka